Amphisbaena acrobeles is a worm lizard species in the family Amphisbaenidae. It is endemic to Brazil.

References

absaberi
Reptiles described in 2009
Endemic fauna of Brazil
Reptiles of Brazil
Taxa named by Síria Ribeiro
Taxa named by Carolina Castro-Mello
Taxa named by Cristiano Nogueira